The Keddie Wye is a railroad junction in the form of a wye on the Union Pacific Railroad in Plumas County, California, United States. Located at the town of Keddie, it joins the east-west Feather River Route and the "Inside Gateway"—formally, the BNSF Gateway Subdivision—which runs north to Bieber.  

A notable feat of railroad engineering, it is the world's only wye with two legs on bridges that meet in a tunnel. The west and north legs of the wye are on bridges over Spanish Creek, and the southeast leg runs through a tunnel (Tunnel No. 32). Just to the northwest, where the two bridged legs join, is Tunnel No. 31. 

The wye and the town are named for Arthur W. Keddie, who purchased the survey rights and the right to build a railroad through the Feather River Canyon from George Jay Gould, the son of Jay Gould.

History
The Western Pacific Railroad (now part of the Union Pacific) built the tracks along the Feather River in 1909 to complete a route from the San Francisco Bay Area to Salt Lake City, Utah, providing an alternate to the Southern Pacific's route over Donner Pass. Keddie was the site of the "last spike" ceremony held on November 1, 1909.

Construction started on the branch running north to Bieber in 1930 and was completed in 1931, along with the north and southeast legs of the wye. This allowed the Western Pacific to diverge from its east-west route (along the west leg of the wye) and go north to an interchange with the Great Northern Railway (now BNSF Railway) and its traffic from the Pacific Northwest.

Railfanning
The Keddie Wye is a favorite railfan spot and is part of Plumas County's 7 Wonders of the Railroad World. Access to the site is described in the county travel guide.

References

External links

 Western Pacific Railroad Museum in Portola, California
 Western Pacific Pictures - Bieber train waits on the Keddie Wye
 
 Keddie Wye, Quincy, California - A showcase of engineering might that was also symbolic of westward expansion
 WP's Keddie Wye

Western Pacific Railroad
Geography of Plumas County, California
Transportation in Plumas County, California
Union Pacific Railroad bridges
Railroad tunnels in California
Rail junctions in the United States